"Sandunguera" is a 1941 guaracha recorded by Puerto Rican bandleader Rafael Muñoz and his orchestra. It was written by Juan Torres Manzano and the original recording featured Tony Sánchez as drummer and lead vocalist. It was released as a single by RCA Victor and later as part of the greatest hits LP Grandes éxitos de Rafael Muñoz y su Orquesta, which included Muñoz's most successful songs. The original recording of "Sandunguera" consists of a big band arrangement of an upbeat guaracha with a strong conga rhythm, which is alluded to in the lyrics.

References

1941 songs
Guaracha